Aurlandsfjellet is a mountainous area and plateau along the border between the municipalities of Aurland and Lærdal in Vestland county, Norway. Norwegian County Road 5627 runs across the mountains, while the Lærdal Tunnel runs through it.

References

Mountains of Vestland
Aurland
Lærdal